Jackson Stewart may refer to: 

Jackson Stewart (cyclist) (b. 1980), U.S. professional road racing cyclist
Jackson Stewart (character), fictional character from U.S. children TV show Hannah Montana
Jackson Stewart (film director) (born 1985), American film director

See also

Stewart Jackson (born 1965), British politician, Conservative MP
Jack Stewart (disambiguation)
Jackie Stewart (disambiguation)